{{DISPLAYTITLE:C4H10S}}
The molecular formula C4H10S may refer to:

 Butanethiol (n-butyl mercaptan), a volatile, clear to yellowish liquid with a fetid odor
 tert-Butylthiol (t-butyl mercaptan), an organosulfur thiol is used as an odorant for natural gas
 Diethyl sulfide, an organosulfur thioether colorless, malodorous liquid